Patron (born 20 July 2019) is a detection dog and mascot for the State Emergency Service of Ukraine. He is a Jack Russell Terrier.

Patron first came to prominence during the 2022 Russian invasion of Ukraine, during which Ukrainian president Volodymyr Zelenskyy awarded him the Order for Courage for his work in locating and defusing unexploded ordnance left behind by Russian troops. As of 8 May 2022, Patron has found 236 such devices.

Life 
Patron was born on 20 July 2019. He was purchased as a puppy by Mykhailo "Misha" Iliev (born c. 1990), a bomb disposal technician with the State Emergency Service of Ukraine. Iliev, who later became Patron's exclusive handler, originally intended to give the puppy to his son as a pet, but soon began training Patron as a detection dog instead.

After Russia invaded Ukraine on 24 February 2022, Patron and Iliev began working to neutralize unexploded Russian bombs and land mines in and around Iliev's hometown of Chernihiv. Patron became a celebrity after the State Emergency Service posted a video on social media site Facebook on 19 March 2022. The video, in which Patron can be seen sniffing around debris and sitting in Iliev's lap while wearing a small bulletproof vest personalized with his name in Cyrillic letters, went viral, garnering over 267,000 views and 16,000 reactions. On the same day, the Ukrainian Ministry of Culture and Information Policy's Centre for Strategic Communications and Information Security reposted the video on the social media site Twitter, on which it garnered over 877,000 views, 27,000 likes, and 6,500 retweets (all numbers current as of 19 July 2022).

Patron is also active in charity work, making visits to patients at Okhmatdyt children's hospital in Kyiv. Due to his viral fame, dangerous work, and charity appearances, Patron has been described as an "unexpected social media weapon" for Ukraine. On 1 September 2022 Ukrposhta started selling Patron charity stamps to raise money for a demining vehicle and animal shelters. It is noted that the growth of Patron's popularity can be part of the Ukrainian information strategy during Russia's invasion (and Ukrainian propaganda as a whole), including the use of viral videos with dramatic stories to form the desired narrative about the war, and its award helped to attract additional attention to the problem of cleansing the clearance territories of Ukraine.

On 5 May 2022, Minister of Internal Affairs Denys Monastyrsky announced the creation of the International Coordination Center for Humanitarian Demining, with Patron as its mascot. Four days later, Ukrainian president Volodymyr Zelenskyy, accompanied by Canadian prime minister Justin Trudeau, jointly honored Patron and Iliev with the Order for Courage, Third Class, thanking them for their service to Ukraine.

On 27 May 2022, Patron was awarded the Palm Dog for "DogManitarian Work" at the 2022 Cannes Film Festival.

UNICEF signed a memorandum of understanding with Patron's representatives recognizing Patron as Goodwill AmbassaDOG in Ukraine, on 20 November 2022, on the occasion of World Children's Day.

In January 2023 a Patron YouTube channel was opened with an animated Patron starring. The cartoons, with English and Polish subtitles, were produced with USAID support and in partnership with UNICEF.

See also 
 Explosive ordnance disposal
 List of individual dogs
 Military animal
 Military mascot

References

External links 

 
 
 
 
 

2019 animal births
Patron
Animals on the Internet
Animated films about dogs
Detection dogs
Dogs in popular culture
Dogs in warfare
Dog mascots
Patron
Patron
Propaganda in Ukraine related to the 2022 Russian invasion of Ukraine
Recipients of the Order For Courage, 3rd class
State Emergency Service of Ukraine